Kari Henriksen (born 10 August 1955) is a Norwegian politician for the Labour Party. She has served as an MP for Vest-Agder since 2009, and the fourth Vice President of the Storting since 2021.

Personal life
She was born in Vennesla.

Political career

Parliament
She served as a deputy representative to the Norwegian Parliament from Vest-Agder during the term 2005–2009 and elected representative for the term 2009–2013 and reelected for 2013-2017. 

On 24 November 2021, she was nominated as the Storting’s fourth Vice President, succeeding fellow party member Sverre Myrli. She was elected the day after, along with Masud Gharahkhani as President of the Storting.

Government
On 3 December 2007, during the second cabinet Stoltenberg, Henriksen was appointed State Secretary in the Ministry of Health and Care Services. She held the position until 3 April 2009.

References

1955 births
Living people
Deputy members of the Storting
Members of the Storting
Labour Party (Norway) politicians
Norwegian state secretaries
Vest-Agder politicians
Politicians from Kristiansand
Women members of the Storting
21st-century Norwegian politicians
21st-century Norwegian women politicians
Norwegian women state secretaries
People from Vennesla